Henry Tyler may refer to:
Henry S. Tyler (1851–1896), American mayor
Henry Tyler (Conservative politician) (1827–1908), British inspector of railways and politician
Henry Tyler (cricketer) (born 1992), Filipino cricketer

See also
Harry Tyler (disambiguation)